Blastodacna rossica is a moth in the family Elachistidae. It is found on the Crimea and in the western part of Transcaucasia and central Asia.

The wingspan is 9–13 mm. Adults are on wing from the end of May to August in Europe and from April to May in central Asia. There is one generation per year.

The larvae feed on Malus species and possibly also on Pyrus communis. They bore in young twigs of their host plant. Larvae can be found in the second half of summer. They overwinter and pupate in spring of the following year.

References

Moths described in 1989
Blastodacna
Moths of Europe